ROSEN Group is a family business, headquartered in Stans, which specializes in the research, development, production, and operation of inspection devices for pipelines and other complex technical systems. The company offers its products and services to the global oil and gas industry as well as other business sectors. In addition, the corporate group develops ‘intelligent plastics’ or functional polymers for various applications.

History

Beginnings 
After completing his studies of measurement and control technology, Hermann Rosen founded an engineering company in Lingen (Ems) in the mid-1970s.   Initially he worked with devices and services related to measuring technology for the agricultural sector, among other things. The foundation of the ROSEN Group was laid in 1981 with the start of the H. Rosen Engineering GmbH. The company worked for customers from the oil and gas industry and offered mainly services for pipelines. In 1988, the company relocated to the industrial park in Lingen (Ems).

Expansion 
In the 1990s, the current ROSEN Group founded a number of branch offices abroad. The locations included: United States, Canada, Mexico, Argentina, Malaysia and Australia.

In 2000, the company moved its headquarters from Lingen to Stans in Switzerland. In the following decade, the network of branch offices expanded to include locations in The Netherlands, United Kingdom, Saudi Arabia, United Arab Emirates, Ukraine, Russia, Brazil, and Colombia.

Despite the relocation of headquarters and corporate expansion, Lingen remained an important location. In 2006, a separate plastics production was established. In September 2012, the Prime Minister of Lower Saxony, David McAllister, opened ROSEN Group's Innovation Center. One year later, a new logistics center using the Kanban system was opened in Lingen.

In October 2013, the company carried out the longest nonstop inspection run until that time in the Nord Stream Pipeline (1,224 km).

Hermann Rosen has managed the corporate group since its inception.
Only for the time period from the beginning of 2013 to the end of 2014, Friedrich Hecker acted as CEO.

The Present

Business Segments 
The corporate group conducts business in three business segments:

 The Asset Care division is mainly concerned with pipeline inspections all over the world. In addition to pipelines, the corporate group also inspects other industrial plants and systems, such as tank systems and pressure vessels, refineries, wind power plants, trains, or tankers. The required inspection devices – among other things, pigs for the internal and unmanned inspection of pipelines – are developed and manufactured inhouse. The big data volumes generated during an inspection are processed, analyzed, and provided to the customers for their decision-making process. The services offered exceed mere inspection and diagnosis. They also include the development of specific programs for maintenance and repair planning as well as for the integrity of technical plans and systems.
 The Enhanced Materials division deals with special plastics – such as polyurethanes or elastomers – in connection with sensor technology and monitoring electronics. Among other things, this division develops and produces special coatings for improved protection of pipes against corrosion, abrasion, or environmental impact. In addition, this division also develops so-called smart plastic systems: polyurethanes are equipped with sensors or electroactive polymers used for purposes of sensor technology, energy generation or actuator engineering.
 The Process Control division advances the development of new technologies and services, such as a brand-new, non-contact electromagnetic acoustic measuring procedures to measure the flow of multiphase media in pipelines of the oil and gas sector and other industries (ROSEN EMAT Flowmeter).

The company reports its vertical range of manufacture to range from 85 and 90%.

Locations 
The company is represented at the following locations:

Headquarters: Stans (Switzerland)

Operating units:

 Bogotá, Colombia
 Buenos Aires, Argentina
 Calgary, Canada
 Dammam, Saudi Arabia
 Dubai, United Arab Emirates
 Gahanna, Ohio, USA
 Houston, USA
 Kyiv, Ukraine
 Kuala Lumpur, Malaysia
 Lingen (Ems), Germany
 Melbourne, Australia
 Mexico City, Mexico
 Moscow, Russia
 Newcastle, United Kingdom
 Oldenzaal, The Netherlands
 Beijing, China
 Perth, Australia
 Rio de Janeiro, Brazil
 Veracruz, Mexico

Technology & Research Center:

 Alzenau, Germany
 Bogota, Colombia
 Dammam, Saudi Arabia
 Lingen (Ems), Germany
 Osnabrück, Germany
 San Luis Obispo, USA
 Stans, Switzerland
 Stutensee near Karlsruhe, Germany

Management and Personnel 

Founder Hermann Rosen manages the corporate group as President and Chairman of the family board. He is responsible for the long-term strategic focus of the company. ROSEN Group employs more than 3,800 employees as of August 2020 Over 1,300 employees work at the company's original location in Lingen (Ems).

Miscellaneous

Symposia 
Every two years since 2012, the company organizes an international symposium (ROSEN Energy and Innovation Forum): Decision-makers from the global oil and gas industry discuss pivotal issues in an interdisciplinary atmosphere.

Educational Activities 
ROSEN Group is very active in the STEM area to provide advancement for children, youth, and university students. Since 1995, the company has been endowing the Advancement Award for Physics (Förderpreis Physik) of the University of Osnabrück. Together with other companies from the Emsland region, ROSEN Group supports university students through the Emsland Scholarship (Emslandstipendium). In addition, ROSEN Group is also one of the patrons of the German national scholarship (Deutschlandstipendium).

To support its international employees and their children, ROSEN Group established a bilingual inhouse daycare (ROKIDS) in Lingen in 2007, the first of its kind in the Emsland district. In the fall of 2015, ROSEN Group's bilingual elementary school (ROBIGS) opened its doors in Lingen.  An extracurricular program for school children and youth was established in early 2016 (ROYOUTH). The daycare, elementary school, and extracurricular program have since been organized under a separate subsidiary.

Awards 
In 2011, ROSEN Group received the Emsländischer Unternehmenspreis corporate award in the category corporate development. 2015, ROSEN Group won the Global Pipeline Award presented by the Pipeline Division of the American Society of Mechanical Engineers (ASME) for its RoMat PGS service. Novel measuring technology allows the determination of carbon steel line pipes’ yield strength for the first time. Measured yield strength of line pipe is used to determine the pipe grade of every pipeline section referring to technical standard API 5L.

In 2012, the inhouse daycare in Lingen received the Arbeitgeberpreis für Bildung (Employer Award for Education) in the area of early childhood education. Furthermore it was honored with the title "House of the little researchers" (Haus der kleinen Forscher) several times. In 2016, the German Choral Association (Deutscher Chorverband) awarded the Caruso Award to the facility.

References

External links 

Stans
Technology companies of Switzerland
Privately held companies of Switzerland
1971 establishments in Germany